Melipotis comprehendens is a species of moth in the family Erebidae. It is found from Mexico (Yucatán, Mérida) and Guatemala to Brazil.

References

Moths described in 1858
Melipotis